Moscow–Shanghai ( or ) is a 1936 German drama film directed by Paul Wegener and starring Pola Negri, Gustav Diessl and Susi Lanner. It was shot at the Babelsberg Studios in Berlin. The film's sets were designed by the art director Alfred Bütow and Willi Herrmann.

Cast
Pola Negri as Olga Petrowna
Wolfgang Keppler as Alexander Repin
Gustav Diessl as Serge Smirnow
Susi Lanner as Maria
Erich Ziegel as Gen. Martow
Karl Dannemann as Grischa
Hugo Werner-Kahle as Commander
Paul Bildt as Gen. Nechludow
Karl Meixner as Pope
Rudolf Schündler as Galgenvogel
Heinz Wemper as Commander in Karewo
Franz Weilhammer as Railway chief
Hanns Waschatko as General in Shanghai
Dorothea Thiess as Mrs. Iwanowna
Walter Gross as Manager in Shanghai
Ernst Behmer as Bahnbeamter
Aribert Grimmer as Train rebel
Gustav Mahncke as Controller
Edwin Jürgensen as Director of nitery
Serge Jaroff as Choral conductor, Don Cossacks
Elsa Wagner as Frau Iwanowna
Charly Berger as Offizier beim Empfang in Moskau
Walter Bischof as Flüchtling

References

Bibliography
 Klaus, Ulrich J. Deutsche Tonfilme: Jahrgang 1936. Klaus-Archiv, 1988.

External links

1936 drama films
German drama films
Films of Nazi Germany
Films directed by Paul Wegener
Russian Revolution films
Films set in Shanghai
Terra Film films
German black-and-white films
Films shot at Babelsberg Studios
1930s German films